The Hong Kong Film Award for Best New Performer is an annual Hong Kong industry award presented to an actor or actress for the best performance by a new artist. The performance is often, but not obligatory, the debut role of the artist.

History
The award was established at the 2nd Hong Kong Film Awards (1983) and the first winner in this category was Ma Si-San for her role in the film Boat People. There are 5, sometimes 6, nominations for the category of Best New Performer from which one actor or actress is chosen the winner of the Hong Kong Film Award for Best New Performer.

The HKFA for Best New Performer was sometimes awarded for a very young actor or actress such as Xu Jiao, who was only nine years old at the time of the award, or Goum Ian Iskandar, a nine-year-old Malaysian actor who won in both supporting actor and best new artist categories for his performance in After This Our Exile. Many recipients of this award become famous figures of the Hong Kong film industry like Anita Yuen, Shu Qi or Cecilia Cheung.

Records

Winners and nominees

See also 
 Hong Kong Film Award
 Hong Kong Film Award for Best Actor
 Hong Kong Film Award for Best Actress
 Hong Kong Film Award for Best Supporting Actor
 Hong Kong Film Award for Best Supporting Actress
 Hong Kong Film Award for Best Action Choreography
 Hong Kong Film Award for Best Cinematography
 Hong Kong Film Award for Best Director
 Hong Kong Film Award for Best Film

References

External links
 Hong Kong Film Awards Official Site

Hong Kong Film Awards
Awards established in 1983